Austin George Higgins (November 29, 1897 – March 3, 1976) was an American football player.  

Higgins was born in 1897 in Louisville, Kentucky. He served in the Army during World War I from August 1917 to January 1919.

From 1921 to 1923, he played professional football, principally at the center position, for the Louisville Brecks in the National Football League (NFL). He appeared in at least seven NFL games, all of those as a starter. He earned a reputation as an ironman player who played entire games. The Courier-Journal later wrote that Higgins, who weighed as little as 155 pounds during his playing career, "didn't know what a substitute was and he never backed away from any of the bigger giants." He left the sport with a blood clot that remained on his left leg for 10 years.

Higgins was married in 1923 to Mary Spellman. After his football career ended, he worked for tobacco companies, including Phillip Morris Tobacco Co., Axton-Fischer Tobacco Co., and finally the Falls City Tobacco Company. He was also one of the top bowlers in Louisville. He died in 1978 at age 78.

References

1897 births
1976 deaths
Louisville Brecks players
Players of American football from Louisville, Kentucky